The T.31 Tandem Tutor is a British military training glider, designed and built by Slingsby and used in large numbers by the Air Training Corps between 1951 and 1986.

Design and development
The T.31 was a tandem two-seat development of the T.8 Tutor (RAF Cadet TX.2). The fuselage was based on that of the T.29 Motor Tutor, increased in length and widened slightly; the wings and tail were unchanged. A single T.31A prototype was flown in 1949, followed by the production T.31B, with spoilers and a small additional wing bracing strut.

Operational history
Chief customer for the T.31B was the Royal Air Force for Air Cadet training; its aircraft were designated as Cadet TX Mark 3. As it was so similar to their existing single-seaters, it allowed easy conversion to solo. The RAF took delivery of 126 TX.3s between 1951 and 1959.

It also found a market with civilian clubs in the UK, although most of these were built from kits and spares, using existing Tutor wings. T.31s were exported to Burma, Ceylon, Israel, Jordan, Lebanon, Pakistan and Rhodesia. In addition, small numbers were built in Argentina, Israel and New Zealand. The T.35 Austral was a one-off development with span increased to 15.64 m (51 ft 3¾ in), sold to the Waikerie Gliding Club in Australia in 1952

After the RAF Cadet TX.3s were replaced by GRP gliders in the mid-1980s, the fleet was sold off, but never gained the same popularity with civilian owners as the side-by-side T.21, being a cheaper glider designed for "circuits and bumps", and only marginally soarable. Some were instead converted to simple ultra-light aircraft as Motor Cadets, with the front cockpit replaced by a Volkswagen or similar engine, and a three-point undercarriage.

Aircraft on display
US Southwest Soaring Museum
Royal Air Force Museum, Hendon.

RAF Manston History Museum has Slingsby Cadet TX.3 VM791 on display marked up as XA312

Operators

Royal Air Force
Air Training Corps

Specifications (Slingsby T.31 Tandem Tutor)

See also

References

Citations

Cited sources

 Ellison, N.H. British Gliders and Sailplanes 1922–1970. A & C Black, 1971
 Coates, Andrew. "Jane's World Sailplanes & Motor Gliders new edition". London, Jane's. 1980.

Other sources
 Simons, M. Slingsby Sailplanes. Airlife Publishing, 1996. 
 Taylor, J. H. (ed) (1989) Jane's Encyclopedia of Aviation. Studio Editions: London. p. 29
 RAF Museum

External links

 Sailplane Directory

1940s British sailplanes
Glider aircraft
Tandem Tutor
Parasol-wing aircraft
Aircraft first flown in 1949